Jo Dusepo, better known simply as Dusepo is a luthier, multi-instrumentalist musician, ethnomusicologist, composer, radio host, sound engineer and producer from London, England. Since November 2014, she has also been a radio host on K2K Radio in Kilburn, west London.

Luthier
Jo Dusepo has worked as a luthier since 2008, and specialises in world and historical stringed instruments.

Musical styles
Many of her earlier music 2006–2010 was ambient, electronic music and dub in style, apart from the 2008 album Blue & Purple, which was minimalism. Since 2012, most of her music has been classical music, folk music, world music and acoustic music.

She has sung in English, German, Spanish, Romanian and Esperanto, and also worked as a sound engineer and producer for other artists.

References

Year of birth missing (living people)
Living people
British luthiers
Lute makers
English experimental musicians
English electronic musicians
Ambient musicians
English multi-instrumentalists
English women singer-songwriters
English women guitarists
English guitarists
English composers
Minimalist composers
English audio engineers
British mandolinists
English songwriters
English lyricists
English jazz musicians
British trip hop musicians
Musicians from London
Ukulele makers
English women in electronic music